Ben Tijnagel (12 June 1964 – 5 December 2005) was a Dutch professional ice hockey player.  He played a total of 18 seasons in either the Eredivisie.  He also competed for the Netherlands in the 1987 World Ice Hockey Championships.

Born in Nijmegen, he joined hometown Nijmegen Tigers and played his first senior level first team hockey at age 16 in 1979.  He had his career best offensive season in 1984-5 when he scored 104 points in just 39 games.  In 1987 he joined Rotterdam Panda's, with whom he remained until 1992, when he rejoined Nijmegen.  He was named Eredivisie MVP for 1979–80.

Tijnagel played once for the national team, scoring 3 goals and collecting an assist in 7 games at the 1987 IIHF World Championships in Pool B.

Tijnagel died as the result of an auto accident on the Bundesautobahn 57 at Meerbusch.

Sources
Tijnagel's career stats at eurohockey.net

1964 births
2005 deaths
Dutch ice hockey forwards
Eredivisie (ice hockey) players
Nijmegen Tigers players
Sportspeople from Nijmegen
Rotterdam Panda's players
Road incident deaths in Germany